Wesley Michael Robinson (born 26 December 1980) is an Australian former first-class cricketer who played for Western Australia.

Robinson made his first class debut for Western Australia at the age of 28. Robinson made 143 representing Cricket Australia's Chairman's XI against an Indian XI in December 2011. Robinson was not offered a new WA contract at the end of 2011–2 season and moved to Victoria, playing for VCA club Footscray-Edgewater in the 2012–13 season.

References

External links
 

1980 births
Living people
Western Australia cricketers
People educated at Newman College, Perth
Australian cricketers
Cricketers from Perth, Western Australia
Australian cricket coaches